The monkey is a novelty dance, most popular in 1963. The dance was popularized by two R&B records: Major Lance's "The Monkey Time", and the Miracles' "Mickey's Monkey" both Top 10 Pop hits released during the summer of 1963.

The monkey is often referenced on the animated series Johnny Bravo (in every theme song in addition to many times in the actual show), although it may be a completely different dance. The TV series The Simpsons also referenced the dance at least twice (in seasons 4 and 8). The thrash metal band Exodus reference the dance in their song "The Toxic Waltz" (from Fabulous Disaster) with the lyric "Used to do the monkey, but now it's not cool". Characters in the anime series Overman King Gainer do the monkey in the opening animation and in the show itself.

The Monkey

 Taking a fighter's crouch, face your partner and stand with feet apart, knees bent. Bend arms and close fists, thumbs up.
 Bend forward from waist to the left, raising right arm. As your body bobs, your head also bobs forward on each count. The whole effect is jerky.
 Straighten up to original position.
 Bend forward from waist toward your partner, facing centre, switching arms as you do so.
 Straighten to original position. Hands and head should give impression of monkey holding two bananas.
 Bend forward from waist to the right. Straighten to original position.
 Bob back to centre, bending at waist and again switching hands.
 Repeat entire pattern. Counts are double time, hitting every accent in the music.

References

Novelty and fad dances